The Libyan Project Management Association (LYPMA) is a Libyan non-profit society for project managers, and specialists involved in the project management industry. The head office for LYPMA is located in Elkish, in the city of Benghazi.

References

External links
  Official blog

Organizations based in Libya
Project management professional associations